Boomerang Justice is a 1922 American silent Western film directed by Edward Sedgwick and starring George Larkin, Fritzi Ridgeway and Al Ferguson.

Cast
 George Larkin as Kit Carson Boone
 Fritzi Ridgeway as Ruth Randolph
 Al Ferguson as Nate Stinson
 Earl Metcalfe as Maxwell
 Virginia Warwick
 Karl Silvera 
 Vester Pegg 
 Tom London
 Bud Osborne

References

External links
 

1922 films
1922 Western (genre) films
1920s English-language films
American black-and-white films
Films directed by Edward Sedgwick
Silent American Western (genre) films
1920s American films